Colonel Sir Robert William Harley  (1829 – 23 August 1892) was a British colonial administrator. He served as governor-in-chief of the Gold Coast, between September 1872 and 2 October 1873.

Harley was born in 1829 and joined the Army in 1847. In 1860 he was a captain in the 3rd West India Regiment. He died on 23 August 1892 at the age of 62.

References

1829 births
1892 deaths
Companions of the Order of the Bath
Knights Commander of the Order of St Michael and St George
West India Regiment officers
Governors of British Tobago
Governors of British Honduras
Governors of the Gold Coast (British colony)
Governors of British Grenada